Luis Yáñez-Barnuevo García (born 12 April 1943 in Coria del Río) is a Spanish politician and Member of the European Parliament for the Spanish Socialist Workers' Party, part of the Party of European Socialists. In 1977 he entered national politics when he was elected to the Spanish national parliament as a deputy for Badajoz Province and was re-elected at the 1979 election as a deputy for Seville Province, representing that district until 2004. From 1985 to 1991, he served as Secretary of State for International Cooperation and for Ibero-America  of Spain.

References

1943 births
Living people
People from Coria del Río
Members of the constituent Congress of Deputies (Spain)
Members of the 1st Congress of Deputies (Spain)
Members of the 2nd Congress of Deputies (Spain)
Members of the 3rd Congress of Deputies (Spain)
Members of the 4th Congress of Deputies (Spain)
Members of the 5th Congress of Deputies (Spain)
Members of the 6th Congress of Deputies (Spain)
Members of the 7th Congress of Deputies (Spain)
Spanish Socialist Workers' Party MEPs
MEPs for Spain 2004–2009
MEPs for Spain 2009–2014